Taruvai Subayya Krishnamurthy (born 1941) is a former Indian Revenue Service officer who served as 13th Chief Election Commissioner (C.E.C) of India (February 2004 - May 2005). His main assignment as C.E.C was to oversee the 2004 elections to the Lok Sabha. He had earlier served in the Election Commission of India as a commissioner since January 2000.

Background
Krishnamurthy started his career as an Indian Revenue Service officer. He served the government at various levels including as Secretary, Department of Company Affairs. He was the first Indian Revenue Service officer to become a Secretary to the Government of India as well as the Chief Election Commissioner of India.

As Secretary, Department of Company Affairs, he is credited with setting up of Investor Education and Protection Fund set up from unclaimed dividends of companies.

Krishnamurthy started his career as a probationary officer at the Bank of India (prior to nationalization) at the age of 19. He joined the Indian Revenue Service in the batch of 1963, subsequent to which he was posted as Income Tax Officer in Madras. Having served number of ministries in New Delhi including Shipping and Finance, he was deputed as a Deputy General Manager with the Hindustan Shipyard Limited in Visakhapatnam. One of the key jobs he has handled was that of Chief Commissioner of Income Tax in Bombay.

He also served as an IMF advisor in Ethiopia and Georgia. As Chief Election Commissioner he was an observer to the elections in Zimbabwe and the U.S Presidential Elections in 2004. In 2005, Krishnamurthy was appointed by the Supreme Court of India to conduct the elections to the Board of Control for Cricket in India (B.C.C.I) in order to ensure free and fair polls amidst the different factions within the BCCI.

Early life and personal history
Krishnamurthy hails from Taruvai village in Tirunelveli district. He was born and brought up in Tiruchirapalli and went on to study high school at Baroda. He went on to study at St Joseph's College, Bangalore. Krishnamurthy won gold medals in History, Economics and Political Science at Mysore University. He also completed a Masters in Fiscal Studies from the University of Bath, U.K.

Post his retirement, he is a board member of various companies and NGOs. He was the Chairman of Bharatiya Vidya Bhavan, Chennai Kendra. He is the author of the book Miracles of Democracy, published in 2008.

Krishnamurthy is married to Geetha Krishnamurthy, a Veena artiste from Chennai.

References

 Shri T.S.Krishnamurthy is a part of the selection jury in Mahaveer Awards presented by Bhagwan Mahaveer Awards.

External links
"T S Krishnamurthy to be new CEC" - Times of India article dated 19 January 2004.
"Krishnamurthy new chief election commissioner" - rediff.com article dated 19 January 2004.
"T.S. KRISHNAMURTHY TAKES OVER AS CHIEF ELECTION COMMISSIONER" Press release by Press Information Bureau, Government of India dated 8 February 2004.

1941 births
Alumni of the University of Bath
Chief Election Commissioners of India
Indian Revenue Service officers
Living people
People from Tirunelveli district
University of Mysore alumni
People from Tiruchirappalli